Yale Park is a public waterfront park located on the shores of  Yale Lake in Washington, United States. Besides a great view of Mount St. Helens, Yale Park provides 30 picnic sites, parking for 130 cars and 80 trailers, a boat ramp with four lanes and a swimming beach.

References

Parks in Washington (state)
Parks in Clark County, Washington